Pseudolithoxus dumus is a species of armored catfish endemic to Venezuela where it occurs in the Orinoco, Negro and Casiquiare canal basins.  This species grows to a length of  SL.

References

External links
Species description

Further reading

Fish described in 2000
Ancistrini
Fish of Venezuela
Endemic fauna of Venezuela
Taxa named by Jonathan W. Armbruster